The Obligin' Buckaroo is a 1927 American silent Western film directed by Richard Thorpe and starring Jay Wilsey, Olive Hasbrouck and James Sheridan.

Cast
 Jay Wilsey as Bill Murray 
 Olive Hasbrouck as Tess Cole 
 James Sheridan as Steve Cole 
 Harry Todd as Bozo Muldoon 
 Raye Hampton as Fifi 
 Slim Whitaker as Blackie

References

Bibliography
 Darby, William. Masters of Lens and Light: A Checklist of Major Cinematographers and Their Feature Films. Scarecrow Press, 1991.

External links
 

1927 films
1927 Western (genre) films
Films directed by Richard Thorpe
1920s English-language films
Pathé Exchange films
American black-and-white films
Silent American Western (genre) films
1920s American films